The 2010–11 season was the 124th season of competitive football by Hamilton Academical and the third back in the top-flight of Scottish football. Hamilton Academical competed in the Scottish Premier League, Scottish Cup and Scottish League Cup.

Overview
Hamilton had a disappointing season seeing them relegated from the Scottish Premier League finishing in 12th place. They managed only 6 wins in all competitions out of the 42 fixtures played.

Results and fixtures

Scottish Premier League

Scottish League Cup

Scottish Cup

League table

Players

Captains

Disciplinary records

Stats valid for Scottish Premier League, Scottish Cup and the Scottish League Cup. Last Updated 16 May.

Top scorers 

Stats valid for Scottish Premier League, Scottish Cup and the Scottish League Cup. Last Updated 16 May.

References

External links
2010–11 Hamilton Academical F.C. season at ESPN
Hamilton Academical Fixtures

Hamilton Academical
Hamilton Academical F.C. seasons